Egileta is a hamlet and concejo located in the municipality of Alegría-Dulantzi, in Álava province, Basque Country, Spain.

Geography 
Egileta is a small exclave located to the southwest of Alegría-Dulantzi.

References

External links
 

Concejos in Alegría-Dulantzi
Enclaves and exclaves